John Hughes (27 January 1865 – 6 June 1941) was an Irish sculptor.

Life
Hughes was born in Dublin and educated at North Richmond Street CBS. He entered the Metropolitan School of Art in Dublin in 1878 and trained as a part-time student for ten years. In 1890 he won a scholarship to the South Kensington School of Art, London, after which another scholarship took him to Paris. He then studied further in Italy. He was appointed as teacher to the Metropolitan School of Art in Dublin in 1894 and in 1902 became Professor of Sculpture in the Royal Hibernian Academy School. His last residence in Dublin was at 28 Lennox Street, Portobello. From 1903 he moved to Paris, where he worked on Ireland's monument to Queen Victoria. In 1905, Hughes became a founding member of the Royal Society of Sculptors. In 1920 he relocated to Florence, where he lived with one of his sisters until 1926, after which he spent most of his time traveling through France and Italy. He died at Nice on 6 June 1941.

Works

In Ireland:
Man of Sorrow; Madonna and Child, both 1901, for Loughrea Cathedral
A dying Irish soldier overlooked by Erin, now in the garden of Dublin Castle Conference Centre
Monument to Charles Kickham, in Tipperary.
Monument to George Salmon, at Trinity College Dublin
Others:
W. E. Gladstone Memorial, intended for the Phoenix Park, but installed instead at Hawarden in 1925.
Queen Victoria, unveiled by the Lord Lieutenant of Ireland in 1907 outside Leinster House in Dublin, re-erected in Sydney, Australia in 1987.

References

External links
Alan Denson: John Hughes, sculptor, 1865-1941: A documentary biography.

1865 births
1941 deaths
Irish sculptors
People from Portobello, Dublin
20th-century Irish sculptors
20th-century male artists
19th-century Irish sculptors
Male sculptors
19th-century male artists
Alumni of the National College of Art and Design